Kevin Garcia may refer to:

Kevin Garcia (musician) (1975–2017), bassist for the band Grandaddy
Kevin Garcia (darts player) (born 1982), English darts player
Kevin García (footballer, born 1989), Spanish football left-back
Kevin Garcia (soccer, born 1990), American soccer defender
Kevin Garcia-Lopez (born 1992), American soccer defender

See also
Kervin García (born 1990), Guatemalan football defender